Jean-Stéphane Bron (1969-) is a Swiss film director.

Born in 1969 in Lausanne, Jean-Stéphane Bron graduated from the École cantonale d'art de Lausanne (ECAL). After Known to Our Departments and The Way I Look at You, he directed for his first theatrical release Corn in Parliament, among the biggest hits in Swiss cinema. His documentary films have been awarded various distinctions in Europe and the United States. In 2006, he made My Brother Is Getting Married, his first fiction film.

Cleveland versus Wall Street, a film that recreates a fictional trial between evicted Clevelanders and bankers blamed for the financial crisis of 2007–2010, which was selected for the Directors' Fortnight sidebar of the 2010 Cannes Film Festival, is his fifth feature-length film.

Filmography 

 L'Opéra de Paris, documentary, 2017 (The Paris Opera).
 L'Expérience Blocher, documentary, 2013 (The Blocher Experience).
 Cleveland contre Wall Street, documentary, 2010 (Cleveland versus Wall Street).
 Mon frère se marie, fiction, 2006 (My Brother Is Getting Married).
 Mais im Bundeshuus – Le génie helvétique, documentary, 2003 (Corn in Parliament).
 La bonne conduite (5 histoires d’auto-école), documentary, 1999 (The Way I Look at You).
 Connu de nos services, documentary, 1997 (Known to Our Departments).

Notes and references

External links 
 
 Director's portrait at Swissfilms
 « Cleveland to Cannes; US foreclosure story on film » , Reuters, New York, April 20, 2010

Swiss film directors
1969 births
People from Lausanne
Living people